Iława Lake District Landscape Park or Iława Lakeland Scenic Park is a protected area (landscape park) in northern Poland. Established in 1993, the park is part of the geographic region called Pojezierze Iławskie (Iława Lakeland). It includes Jeziorak lake and the Lasy Iławskie (Iławskie Forest or Iława Woods, or Forests) spread out on the west side of Jeziorak.

The Park is shared between two voivodeships: Pomeranian Voivodeship and Warmian-Masurian Voivodeship. Within Pomeranian Voivodeship it lies in Sztum County (Gmina Stary Dzierzgoń). Within Warmian-Masurian Voivodeship it lies in Iława County (Gmina Iława, Gmina Susz, Gmina Zalewo).

Within the Landscape Park are three nature reserves.

See also

Special Protection Areas in Poland

References 

Landscape parks in Poland
Parks in Pomeranian Voivodeship
Natura 2000 in Poland